Balconi is an Italian surname. Notable people with the surname include:

 Lorenzo Maria Balconi (1878 – 1969), Italian archbishop of the Catholic Church, missionary, and writer
 Marcella Balconi (1919 – 1999), Italian child psychiatrist, member of the resistance during World War II and a Parliamentary member
 Tais Balconi (born 1991), Brazilian rugby sevens player

See also 

 Balconi

Italian-language surnames